Leptopetalum pachyphyllum is a species of flowering plant in the family Rubiaceae, native to the Volcano Islands, belonging to Japan.

References

Spermacoceae
Flora of the Volcano Islands
Plants described in 1968